Norman Shaw (birth and death dates unknown) was a professional rugby league footballer who played in the 1920s and 1930s. He played at club level for the Featherstone Rovers (Heritage № 75).

Background
Norman Shaw was born in Featherstone, Wakefield, West Riding of Yorkshire, England.

Club career
Norman Shaw made his début for the Featherstone Rovers on Thursday 13 September 1928.

References

External links
Search for "Shaw" at rugbyleagueproject.org

English rugby league players
Featherstone Rovers players
Place of death missing
Rugby league players from Featherstone
Year of birth missing
Year of death missing